Gesher Theater is an Israeli theater company founded in 1991 in Tel Aviv by new immigrants from Russia.

History

Gesher Theatre was founded in Israel in 1991 with the support of the Ministry of Education and Culture, the Jewish Agency, the City of Tel Aviv-Yafo, The Tel Aviv Development Foundation and the Zionist Forum. Gesher Theatre consists mostly of new immigrants from Russia, and is now regarded as an inseparable part of Israeli culture.

Yevgeny Arye, Gesher Theatre's Founder and Artistic Director to this very day, was a reputable and successful stage and screen director in Moscow, laureate of many prizes in Russia and elsewhere.

Gesher Theater is one of the only bi-lingual theaters in the world, performing with the same troupe in Russian and in Hebrew alternately. Nowadays most of the productions are staged in Hebrew. The unique quality of the theater may also be attributed to its artistic conception, which combines the principles of traditional Russian theater with an original and innovative approach.
 
Gesher's first production, Tom Stoppard’s Rosencrantz and Guildenstern Are Dead, debuted in April 1991, immediately after the Gulf War. The headline “The Russian Miracle of Israeli Theatre” (Dvar Hashavua, August 1991), captures the essence of the unprecedented reactions with which the production was received.  The play was chosen to represent Israeli theatre in New York in January 1992.

In September 1992, Gesher staged the triumphant Molière in Hebrew at the Zurich Festival.

In July 1993, Gesher was the first Israeli theatre to be invited to the prestigious Festival d’Avignon. The French media praised Director Yevgeny Arye and Gesher's actors, who played Rosencrantz and Guildenstern Are Dead at the festival.
In late August 1993, the play was staged at the Basel Festival.

Gesher's production of "The Idiot" was hailed as an exceptional theatrical achievement.

"The Idiot", which won the Meir Margalit Theatre Prize]] for 1993, was played in the Manchester Festival in Autumn 1994 and entered the competition for “best play”, with Israel Demidov contending in the “best actor” category.

In 1993, after only two years of activity marked by impressive achievements, Gesher won institutional recognition and was awarded the status of public theater.

In 1994, the Theater took it upon itself to deal with one of the most difficult and painful subjects in history – the Holocaust, in the play Adam Resurrected by Alexander Chervinsky, based on the novel by Yoram Kaniuk. The world premieres of Adam Resurrected were staged at the Vienna Festival in June 1993 and in the Basel Festival in August 1993.
In Autumn 1994 Gesher took Adam Resurrected on a three-week tour of Germany. In Dresden, Erfurt and Berlin, the play reaped tremendous success. The renowned German television network ZDF opened its story with the words “It has happened. Gesher Theatre has shaken Berlin with its play Adam Resurrected”.
Ori Levy, formerly a Cameri actor and Administrative Director, was appointed as Director General of Gesher Theater in June 1995.

In February 1996, Gesher Theater debuted "Village", an original play by Yehoshua Sobol. The play deals with a small settlement in the land of Israel at the end of World War II, before the establishment of the State of Israel.

In April 1997, Village earned Gesher Theatre the five most important categories of the Israel Theater Prize.

In May of that year Gesher arrived in London, after touring England for 5 weeks with Village. The play was a huge success with both audiences and critics. The Times’ theatre critic wrote that “Gesher is one of the greatest and most important troupes in the world”.
The play was equally successful also on its tours in Germany, New York, Italy, Australia and Ireland.

In December 1996, Gesher debuted City – Odessa Stories, an adaptation of stories by the Russian author Isaac Babel. The play is an anthology portraying the Jewish underworld in Odessa before World War I, and was tremendously successful.
 
The production was invited to the Kennedy Center in Washington and was the highlight of the 50th anniversary celebrations for the State of Israel. The play was staged in Paris, at the London Barbican, and in Berlin.

In 1998 Gesher II was founded, a workshop for young Israeli actors who joined Gesher as a reserve, for a natural development in the process of Gesher's absorption in the Israeli theater scene. In February 1998, the group played Molière's Don Juan.

On its 8th anniversary, Gesher Theater received its permanent residence, Noga Theater in Jaffa, as a gift from the City of Tel Aviv-Yafo.

Gesher Theatre has formed into a permanent theatrical ensemble under the artistic direction of Yevgeny Arye, who has directed most of Gesher's productions.

In 1999, Leander Haussmann, Artistic Director of the German Bochum Theatre, was invited to Gesher to direct Schiller's Intrigue and Love. The production represented Israel in the prestigious Schiller Festival in Mannheim, Germany, and won excellent reviews and great success.

In December 2000, Gesher Theatre debuted the great theatrical project of The Devil in Moscow, an original musical based on Mikhail Bulgakov’s famed novel The Master and Margarita. The Devil in Moscow debuted with Haim Topol and another 30 actors, a 23-player orchestra and a multimedia spectacle.

The play won 6 categories of the Israel Theatre Prize for the year 2000-2001.

In April 2002 Gesher debuted The Slave, an adaptation of the book by Nobel Prize laureate Isaac Bashevis Singer. The play reaped praise and is generating interest in many festivals around the world. The Slave has recently won all 5 prestigious categories of the Israel Theater Prize – Play of the year, Director of the year, Actress of the year, Set designer of the year and Lighting designer of the year.

In September 2002 Gesher staged The Threepenny Opera by Bertolt Brecht and Kurt Weill, under the direction of the renowned Russian director Adolph Shapiro.

In May 2003, Gesher staged an adaptation to another work of the author Isaac Bashevis Singer – “Shosha”, again reaping exceptional reviews and a wonderful audience response.

Gesher continues to be Israel's most important representative theater. In November 2002 it staged “Village” in the famous festivals of Riga and Warsaw.

In October 2003, following a formal invitation from the Russian Ministry of Culture, the theater went on a tour in Moscow with “The Slave”, “City” and ”Village”, plays that were staged at “MXAT, Chekhov Artistic Theater founded by Stanislavsky.

The tour achieved unprecedented impact in the media, the critics went overboard, the halls were packed and tickets were sold on the black market.

In 2004, on its thirteenth birthday, Gesher was invited to perform in the prestigious festival of Lincoln Center in New York. The tour achieved incredible success with the plays “The Slave” and “Shosha”.

On September 3, 2004, the play “Adam Resurrected” opened the Four Cultures Festival in the city of Łódź in Poland. It is tough to describe the amazing experience of playing “Adam Resurrected” in the old marketplace from which the Jews of Poland were sent to the extermination camps, Auschwitz and Chelmno. The play was invited to open the festival that marks 60 years to the wiping out of Łódź Ghetto. Gesher Theatre received amazing reviews in Poland's central newspapers.

In June 2004, Gesher Theater staged the play Marriage of Figaro crazy classic comedy, directed by Yevgeny Arye.

Later that year, in July 2004, the play “The Cripple of Inishmaan” by the successful playwright Martin McDonagh, and directed by Ilan Toren, a visiting director with Gesher Theater, was staged.

In early 2005, Gesher Theater staged Medea – a contemporary view of a Greek classic. The play was produced by Lena Kreindlin, the first woman director in Gesher Theater. In the course of the fifth performance, during a particularly dramatic monologue, the play's star, Yevgenya Dodina, tripped and broke her ankle. As a result of the main actress's injury the theater was forced to cancel the play for many months.

In May 2005, Gesher Theatre, under the direction of Yevgeny Arye, staged a production - “Variations for Theater and Orchestra” – an anthology of Russian songs as a mirror of the Russian culture.

The play that won the Israeli Theater Academy Award for best entertainment show for 2005, enraptured the Israeli audience.

The play won the Israeli Theatre Academy Award for best entertainment show for 2005, as well as the Best Choreographer.

At the end of May 2005, the theater went on a second tour in Moscow with the play “Shosha”, at the Cherry Forest Festival in the prestigious Sovremennik Theatre. The festival marked 60 years of victory over the Nazis and the end of the Second World War. Gesher Theater was one of the stars of the festival, and once again reaped fabulous praise and reviews on the theatre's high level.

In June 2005, the theater performed in Toronto, with the plays “City – Odessa Stories” and “Shosha”.

The theater was invited to perform in the Kopfler Arts Center. The invitation was received at the initiative of the Friends of Gesher Theater Association in Israel and the Jewish community in Toronto.

In July 2005, Gesher Theater, sponsored by the Bracha Fund, staged “Momik”, an adaptation of David Grossman’s best selling novel “See under: Love”.

In the beginning of October 2005, the play “Pillowman” by Martin McDonagh, was staged. The play which premiered at the National Theatre in England and won the Olivier Award for best play 2004, and in 2005 won the American Tony Award – was staged with translation by and under the direction of Ben Bar-Shavit.

In October 2005, at the invitation of Poland's National Theatre, the play “Shosha” was staged in Warsaw, Poland. It was the third time that Gesher Theater was invited to perform in Poland, this time with a play whose plot takes place in 1930s Warsaw. The play reaped good and moving reviews.
 
Gesher Theatre adopted Yehezkel Lazarovs’ one man play – “Hezi”. The play was staged in December 2005. The play was written and directed by Yehezkel Lazarov who also  Yankaleh Jacobson acted as art consultant.

In January 2006, the play “Design for living”, by Sir Noël Coward, was staged under the direction of Lena Kreindlin for whom this was the second play at Gesher Theater.

In May 2006, Gesher Theatre was awarded an Honorary Ph.D. from Bar Ilan University.

In July 2006, the play “Late Love” by Isaac Bashevis Singer was staged, directed by Yevgeny Arye. Gesher Theater returned to its roots and to tradition and staged the play in the Russian language. Stars from the former Soviet Union: Leonid Kanevsky, Klara Novikova and Andree Organt participate in the play.

In November 2006, Yevgeny Arye, the director and the artistic director of the theater was awarded the Honorary Ph.D. from Weizmann Institute of Science. He had received an Honorary Ph.D. from the Hebrew University in Jerusalem in the past, and was also awarded, together with Gesher Theater, an Honorary Ph.D. from Bar Ilan University.

In late December 2006, the play “Baron Munchausen” – The Whole Truth About the Lie, by the famous Russian playwright Gregory Gorin, directed by Yevgeny Arye, was staged. The character of the Baron Munchausen is known to all as the greatest exaggerator of all times. The playwright chose to deal with the Baron's character and through this examine the gap between the Baron and the myth that was created around him. The truth about the lie in which we live.

In February 2007, the play “The Elder Son” by the popular and well known Russian playwright Alexander Vampilov, was staged. The play is a sensitive and moving comedy. The play was directed by Lena Kreindlin and in the main role Moshe Ivgy.

In April 2007, the one man act “This is How it Happened”, according to a novel by Natalia Ginzburg, performed by Natasha Manor, winner of the Best Actress Award in the Theatroneto Festival 2007, was staged.

In May 2007, the Israel Lions Award in the field of culture and art was awarded to Gesher Theatre and its Director General Ori Levy, for his contribution to the development of the theatre, and for a life work in the field of absorption of new immigrant artists/actors.

In May 2007, the Ruppin Academic Center awarded an Honorary award to Gesher Theater.

In June 2007, the play “Yakish and Poupche” according to a play by Hanoch Levin, was staged. Adaptation and direction: Yevgeny Arye and Shimon Meemeran. For the first time, Gesher Theatre staged a play by Hanoch Levin and brought to life, through the play, an artistic and social tie which was nurtured between Levin and Yevgeny Arye, the artistic director of the theatre. Levin proposed to write a play especially for Gesher Theatre, but despite the greatly expected joint work, the play never materialized due to Levin's demise.

In 2007 Roy Chen joined Gesher theatre as the house dramaturge. Since then Gesher perform productions based on his original plays: I am Don Quixote (2015), The Dybbuk (a new version of the classic play by Ansky) along with original plays for the whole family: The Odyssey (2014), Spirit of the Theatre (2106). Chen wrote many adaptations for stage of classic novels such as A Pigeon and a Boy by Meir Shalev, Enemies, a Love Story by Isaac Bashevis Singerת etc.

Plays at Gesher Theater

 “Rosencrantz and Guildenstern Are Dead”
 “The Dreifus Trial”
 “Molière”
 “The Idiot”
 “Adam Resurrected”
 “Lower Depths”
 “Tartuffe”
 “Village”
 “City – Odessa Stories”
 “Three Sisters”
 “Don Juan”
 “Eating”*
 “Intrigue and Love”
 “The River”
 “Sea”
 “Moscow – Petushky”
 “On Borrowed Time” [Mr. Brink]
 “The Devil in Moscow”
 “Miss Julie”
 “Midsummer Night’s Dream”
 “The Contrabass”
 “The Slave”
 “The Threepenny Opera”
 “Love and Human Remains”
 “Shosha”
 “After Play”
 “Figaro’s Marriage”
 “The Cripple Boy From Ineshman”
 “Medea”
 “Variations for Theatre and Orchestra”
 “Momik”
 “Pillowman”
 “Hezi”
 “Design for Living”
 “Cherry Orchard”
 “Late Love”
 “Munchausen”
 “The Elder Son”
 “This is How it Happened”
 “Yakish and Poupche”

References

External links

Gesher Theater website
Michael Kramenko, Gesher Theater Set designer website

Further reading 
 Olga Gershenson. Gesher: Russian Theatre in Israel; A Study of Cultural Colonization, 2005

Theatre companies in Israel
Jewish theatres
Performing groups established in 1991
1991 establishments in Israel
Theatres in Jaffa